Felipe Sierra (1902 – death unknown) was a Cuban second baseman in the Negro leagues between 1921 and 1932. 

A native of Sagua la Grande, Cuba, Sierra made his Negro league debut in 1921 with the All Cubans. He spent nine seasons with the Cuban Stars (West), and played his final season in 1932 with the Cuban Stars (East). Sierra also played one season in the Cuban League with the Leopardos de Santa Clara.

References

External links
 and Baseball-Reference Black Baseball stats and Seamheads

1902 births
Date of birth missing
Year of death missing
Place of death missing
All Cubans players
Cuban Stars (East) players
Cuban Stars (West) players
Leopardos de Santa Clara players
Baseball infielders